KTXY (106.9 FM), branded as "Y107", is a Top 40 Mainstream radio station licensed to Jefferson City, Missouri that serves central Missouri including Columbia. It is owned by the Zimmer Radio Group, and broadcasts with an Effective Radiated Power (ERP) of 96 kilowatts.

History

1969-1981: Easy Listening 
The station was issued a Construction Permit on April 29, 1969, and became fully licensed as KJFF  on December 1, 1969. It first aired a beautiful music format.

1981-1988: Adult Contemporary 
On October 28, 1981 under new ownership of Brill Media, it changed its call sign to KTXY and became an adult contemporary format.

1988-1992: Top 40 
In 1982, it would switch the format to Top 40/CHR as Music 107, marking it one of two dominant CHR stations in the mid-Missouri area at the period, with the other being KCMQ. Its current name Y107 was introduced in 1988.

1992-1993: Adult Contemporary 
On October 5, 1992, its call letters were changed to KKFA, with a soft rock format called "The Cafe" for a short period before returning to the KTXY call letters.

1993-present: Top 40 
On October 11, 1993, the station returned to a Top 40 format as Y-107. After competitor KCMQ dropped its CHR format in 1994, KTXY became the only dominant CHR station for the mid-Missouri region. Since 2001, its main competitor is similarly formatted KOQL.

References

External links
Official Website
FCC Cosmo & JC Notice

FCC History cards (covering 1969-1981 as KJFF)

TXY-FM
Contemporary hit radio stations in the United States
Radio stations established in 1969
1969 establishments in Missouri